Tau Daha is a tourist destination located in Kirtipur, Nepal. The fresh air, silent water, fish feeding, bird watching, and photography are major attractions.

References

Kathmandu District